Daylight Again is the seventh album by Crosby, Stills & Nash, and their third studio album in the trio configuration. It peaked at No. 8 on the Billboard 200 albums chart, the final time the band has made the top ten to date. Three singles were released from the album, all making the Billboard Hot 100: "Wasted on the Way" peaked at No. 9, "Southern Cross" at No. 18, and "Too Much Love to Hide" at No. 69. The album was certified platinum by the RIAA with sales of 1,850,000.

Background
The genesis of the album lies in recordings made by Stephen Stills and Graham Nash at intervals in 1980 and 1981 and the album was originally slated to be a Stills–Nash project.  They employed Art Garfunkel, Timothy B. Schmit, and others to sing in place of where David Crosby might have been. Executives at Atlantic Records, however, had little interest in anything but CSN product from any member of the group, and held out for the presence of Crosby, forcing Nash and Stills to start paying for the sessions out-of-pocket.  They began to turn toward the company's point of view, however, and decided to invite Crosby to participate at the eleventh hour.

Crosby brought two tracks to the album: "Delta", where Stills and Nash squeezed their vocals into Crosby's already-taped multi-tracked harmonies, and "Might As Well Have a Good Time", which received the bona fide Crosby, Stills & Nash treatment.  Most of the recording, however, features other voices in addition to the main trio, a first for any CSNY record, as is the number of outside writers. Graham Nash wrote the album's biggest hit, "Wasted on the Way", about the time the group spent in squabbles and diversions rather than concentrating on their music.  The second single, "Southern Cross", was Stills' partial rewrite of a song by brothers Richard and Michael Curtis.  The song "Daylight Again" evolved out of Stills' guitar-picking to accompany on-stage stories regarding the South in the Civil War, segueing into "Find the Cost of Freedom", which had been the B-side of the "Ohio" single in 1970.

Daylight Again was the band's first album in the video age, and a video was filmed for "Southern Cross" featuring the band and one of their favorite metaphors, a sailing vessel. It received a fair amount of rotation on MTV in 1982 and 1983, and helped to propel the album's sales.

The album has been released on compact disc on three occasions: an initial time in the 1980s; remastered using the original master tapes by Ocean View Digital and reissued on September 20, 1994; and again remastered using the HDCD process and reissued by Rhino Records on January 24, 2006, with four bonus tracks.

Track listing

Side one

Side two

2006 bonus tracks

Personnel 
Crosby, Stills & Nash
 David Crosby – vocals, keyboards (5)
 Stephen Stills – vocals, Rhodes piano (1, 6), electric guitar (1, 3, 4, 6, 7, 9, 12-14), acoustic guitar (2, 3, 11), Yamaha CP-30 analog stage piano (6), percussion (7), banjo (11), keyboards (12)
 Graham Nash – vocals, electric guitar (1, 4), organ (4), percussion (7), acoustic piano (8), harmonica (9)

Additional musicians
 Mike Finnigan – organ (1, 7, 10, 13, 14), additional vocals (1, 3, 4, 6, 7, 9), Yamaha CP-30 analog stage piano (3), electric piano (4), acoustic piano (7), keyboards (9)
 Craig Doerge – synthesizers (1, 5, 8, 14), keyboards (2, 5, 12), Rhodes piano (8), acoustic piano (10, 14, 15)
 Richard T. Bear – acoustic piano (3), synthesizers (3)
 Jay Ferguson – organ (8)
 James Newton Howard – keyboards (12)
 Michael Stergis – electric guitar (1, 4, 7, 13, 14), acoustic guitar (2, 3, 6, 8, 9)
 Joel Bernstein – acoustic guitar (2, 8), electric guitar (8)
 Dean Parks – electric guitar (5)
 Gerry Tolman – electric guitar (6)
 Danny Kortchmar – electric guitar (12)
 George "Chocolate" Perry – bass (1, 3, 4, 6, 7, 9, 12-14)
 Bob Glaub – bass (2)
 Leland Sklar – bass (5)
 Joe Vitale – drums (1, 3, 4, 7, 9, 13, 14)
 Russ Kunkel – drums (2, 5, 8)
 Jeff Porcaro – drums (6, 12)
 Joe Lala – percussion (2-4, 6, 7, 9, 13), congas (12)
 Wayne Goodwin – fiddle (2), cello arrangements (8)
 Roberleigh Barnhart – cello (8)
 Ernie Ehrhardt – cello (8)
 Miguel Martinez – cello (8)
 Timothy B. Schmit – additional vocals (1-4, 8, 14), bass (8)
 Art Garfunkel – additional vocals (11)

Production 
 Crosby, Stills & Nash – producers (1-4, 6-11)
 Steve Gursky – co-producer (1-4, 6-11), engineer 
 Stanley Johnston – co-producer (1-4, 6-11), producer (10), engineer 
 Craig Doerge – producer (5, 10)
 Stephen Barncard – additional engineer 
 Gaylord Holomalia – second engineer
 Jerry Hudgins – second engineer
 Gerry Lentz – second engineer
 Jay Parti – second engineer
 Gordon Rowley – second engineer
 Russell Schmitt – second engineer
 Stan Richter – original mastering 
 Joe Gastwirt – digital remastering
 Jimmy Wachtel – art direction   
 Mac James – logo design
 Gilbert Williams – front cover painting
 Henry Diltz – back cover photography 
 Mark Hanauer – front cover photography      
 Eric Waltersheid – front cover photo assistant 
 Bill Siddons – management
 Crosslight Management – management 
 Jeff Wald & Associates – management

2006 Expanded Edition credits
 Gerry Tolman – executive producer 
 James Austin – executive producer
 Stephen Stills – producer 
 Graham Nash – producer 
 Joel Bernstein – producer 
 Stanley Johnston – producer, recording (12-15), mixing (12-14), mastering assistant, tape reviewing 
 Steve Gursky – recording (12-14)
 Gerry Lentz – recording assistant (12-14)
 Jay Parti – recording assistant (15)
 Stephen Barncard – mixing (15)
 Greg Hayes – mix assistant (12-14), digital editing (12-14)
 Cory Frye – editorial supervision
 Bernie Grundman – mastering
 David Merchant – tape archivist 
 John Nowland – tape transfers
 Greg Allen – art direction, design 
 Kenny Nemes – product manager
 Ginger Dettman – project assistant 
 Karen LeBlanc – project assistant 
 Steve Woolard – project assistant

Charts 

Year-end charts

Certifications

References

1982 albums
Atlantic Records albums
Crosby, Stills, Nash & Young albums
Albums produced by Graham Nash
Albums produced by Stephen Stills
Albums produced by David Crosby
Albums with cover art by Jimmy Wachtel